David Marrero and Santiago Ventura were the defending champions but decided not to participate.
Lukáš Rosol and Igor Zelenay won the final after beating Martin Fischer and Andreas Haider-Maurer 6–3, 6–2.

Seeds

Draw

Draw

External links
 Main Draw

Open Barletta Trofeo Dimiccoli and Boraccino - Doubles
2011 Doubles